Kyle Alandy Amor (also known as Kyle Amor), is an American visual artist, commercial model, singer, and actor of Filipino descent. He first appeared on 1DOL, a musical teleserye on ABS-CBN as one of the band members of Da Vince Code alongside Sam Milby. He was also cast as one of the talents on the teen musical variety show, Shoutout! on ABS-CBN.

Kyle is co-managed by Cornerstone Talents and Star Magic.

Music

Kyle has a self-titled album out in the Philippines with the band 3AM under Star Records and has performed and appeared several times on ABS-CBN's late night music show, Music Uplate Live (MUL Live) hosted by Yeng Constantino. 3AM has also been nominated twice for their self-titled debut album at the 3rd PMPC Star Awards for Music for Best Duo/Group Artist and Alternative Album of the Year.

Modeling
Kyle, apart from 3:00 am, is a sought-after print and TV commercial model having appeared in several billboards, commercials, and print magazines in the Philippines. He has modelled for Loalde clothing, endorsed Nescafe's 3in1, and has had several printads and a television commercial for Century Tuna.

In 2011, Kyle was named one of Chalk Magazine's 50 Hottest and was also listed in Meg magazine as one of their Hotties of Summer.

Visual Arts Background
Aside from modeling, music and television, Kyle is also a visual/graphics artist who is fond of drawing and painting. He has designed for clients in both America and the Philippines.

Filmography

TV shows

Movies

TV Appearances

TV commercials

Music videos

Albums
3AM (2011, Star Records)

References

External links
 Kyle Amor Official Site
 Kyle Amor Official Art Portfolio Site
 Kyle Amor (3AM) on Star Records website
 

Year of birth missing (living people)
Living people
American expatriates in the Philippines
Male models from California
American male singers
American musicians of Filipino descent
Star Magic personalities